The following highways are numbered 512:

United States